The 2017–18 San Miguel Alab Pilipinas season is the 2nd season of the franchise in the ASEAN Basketball League (ABL).

Roster

Standing

Elimination

Game log

|- style="background:#fbb;"
| 1
| November 19
| Hong Kong Eastern Basketball Team
| L 89–92 
| Reggie Okosa (28)
| Ivan Johnson (15)
| Ivan Johnson (3)
| Mall of Asia Arena
| 0–1
|- style="background:#fbb;"
| 2
| November 29
| Singapore Slingers
| L 83–97 
| Reggie Okosa (24)
| Reggie Okosa (10)
| Parks Jr., Johnson (4)
| Sta. Rosa Arena
| 0–2

|- style="background:#fbb;"
| 3
| December 13
| Hong Kong Eastern Basketball Team
| L 96–99 
| Ivan Johnson (32)
| Reggie Okosa (13)
| Parks Jr. (10)
| Southorn Stadium
| 0–3
|- style="background:#cfc;"
| 4
| December 16
| Formosa Dreamers
| W 78–61 
| Reggie Okosa (19)
| Reggie Okosa (19)
| Josh Urbiztondo (7)
| Changhua Stadium
| 1–3

|- style="background:#cfc;"
| 5
| January 3
| Westports Malaysia Dragons
| W 90–79 
| Justin Brownlee (29)
| Renaldo Balkman (11)
| Josh Urbiztondo (9)
| Filoil Flying V Centre
| 2–3
|- style="background:#cfc;"
| 6
| January 7
| Singapore Slingers
| W 89–80 
| Renaldo Balkman (26)
| Renaldo Balkman (8)
| Justin Brownlee (8)
| OCBC Arena
| 3–3
|- style="background:#fbb;"
| 7
| January 10
| Singapore Slingers
| L 80–90 
| Renaldo Balkman (24)
| Renaldo Balkman (12)
| Bobby Ray Parks Jr. (4)
| Filoil Flying V Centre
| 3–4
|- style="background:#cfc;"
| 8
| January 14
| Mono Vampire Basketball Club
| W 114–87 
| Justin Brownlee (29)
| Rico Maierhofer (8)
| Justin Brownlee (9)
| Stadium 29
| 4–4
|- style="background:#cfc;"
| 9
| January 20
| CLS Knights Indonesia
| W 92–87 
| Justin Brownlee (36)
| Renaldo Balkman (13)
| Justin Brownlee (7)
| GOR CLS Kertajaya
| 5–4
|- style="background:#cfc;"
| 10
| January 28
| Saigon Heat
| W 95-87
| Renaldo Balkman (26)
| Renaldo Balkman (20)
| Renaldo Balkman (6)
| CIS Arena Saigon
| 6–4
|- style="background:#cfc;"
| 11
| January 31
| Nanhai Kung Fu
| W 94–91 
| Bobby Ray Parks Jr. (31)
| Renaldo Balkman (16)
| Justin Brownlee (6)
| Sta. Rosa Arena
| 7–4

|- style="background:#cfc;"
| 12
| February 4
| Singapore Slingers
| W 82–69 
| Renaldo Balkman (21)
| Justin Brownlee (10)
| Bobby Ray Parks (4)
| OCBC Arena(2,800)
| 8–4
|- style="background:#cfc;"
| 13
| February 7
| Mono Vampire
| W 86–84 
| Renaldo Balkman (31)
| Renaldo Balkman (13)
| Justin Brownlee (8)
| Baliwag Star Arena
| 9–4
|- style="background:#cfc;"
| 14
| February 11
| CLS Knights
| W 80–73 
| Renaldo Balkman (36)
| Brownlee, Domingo (12)
| Justin Brownlee (9)
| GOR CLS Kertajaya
| 10–4
|- style="background:#cfc;"
| 15
| February 18
| Formosa Dreamers
| W 117–93 
| Justin Brownlee (27)
| Renaldo Balkman (14)
| Josh Urbiztondo (7)
| Sta. Rosa Arena
| 11–4

|- style="background:#fbb;"
| 16
| March 4
| Westports Malaysia Dragons
| L 89–90 
| Renaldo Balkman (33)
| Renaldo Balkman (19)
| Justin Brownlee (7)
| MABA Stadium
| 11–5
|- style="background:#fbb;"
| 17
| March 11
| Chong Son Kung Fu
| L 79–92 
| Renaldo Balkman (29)
| Renaldo Balkman (8)
| Justin Brownlee (5)
| Nanhai Gymnasium
| 11–6
|- style="background:#cfc "
| 18
| March 14
| Saigon Heat
| W 126–100 
| Renaldo Balkman (30)
| Justin Brownlee (13)
| Brownlee, Javelona (4)
| USEP Gymnasium & Cultural Center Davao
| 12–6
|- style="background:#cfc "
| 19
| March 21
| CLS Knights Indonesia
| W 84–67 
| Bobby Ray Parks Jr. (21)
| Lawrence Domingo (12)
| Brownlee, Balkman (5)
| Baliuag Star Arena
| 13–6
|- style="background:#cfc "
| 20
| March 25
| CLS Knights Indonesia
| W 101–63 
| Pamboy Raymundo (20)
| Nico Paolo Javelona (10)
| Parks, Brownlee (6)
| Sta. Rosa Arena
| 14–6

Playoffs

Game log 

|- style="background:#cfc "
| 1
| April 1
| Saigon Heat
| W 110–100 
| Bobby Ray Parks Jr. 24
| Renaldo Balkman 20
| Justin Brownlee 8
| Filoil Flying V Centre, San Juan
| 1–0
|- style="background:#cfc "
| 2
| April 7
| Saigon Heat
| W 96–85 
| Balkman, Domingo 21
| Justin Brownlee 13
| Paolo Javelona 4
| CIS Arena, Ho Chi Minh City
| 2–0

|- style="background:#cfc "
| 1
| April 11
| Hong Kong Eastern
| W 98–94
| Renaldo Balkman 46
| Renaldo Balkman 14
| Justin Brownlee 9
| Southorn Stadium, Wan Chai
| 1–0
|- style="background:#cfc "
| 2
| April 15
| Hong Kong Eastern
| W 79–72 
| Justin Brownlee 22
| Bobby Ray Parks Jr. 13
| Bobby Ray Parks Jr. 5
| Santa Rosa Multi-Purpose Complex, Santa Rosa
| 2–0

Transactions

Recruited imports

References

Tanduay Alab Pilipinas seasons
Tanduay Alab Pilipinas Season, 2017-18